Turn This Club Around is the third studio album from German Dance-Band R.I.O. It was first released on 2 December 2011 in Germany. The album peaked at No. 29 on the Swiss Albums Chart.

Track listing

Charts

Release history

Track listing

References 

2011 albums
R.I.O. albums